Keith Ward  (born 1938) is an English  philosopher, and theologian. He is a fellow of the British Academy and a priest of the Church of England. He was a canon of Christ Church, Oxford, until 2003. Comparative theology and the relationship between science and religion are two of his main topics of interest.

Academic work

Ward was born on 22 August 1938 in Hexham. He graduated in 1962 with a Bachelor of Arts degree from the University of Wales and from 1964 to 1969 was a lecturer in logic at the University of Glasgow. He earned a Bachelor of Letters degree from Linacre College, Oxford, in 1968. From 1969 to 1971 he was lecturer in philosophy at the University of St Andrews.

In 1972, he was ordained as a priest in the Church of England. From 1971 to 1975 he was lecturer in philosophy of religion at the University of London. From 1975 to 1983, he was dean of Trinity Hall, Cambridge. He was appointed the F. D. Maurice Professor of Moral and Social Theology at the University of London in 1982, professor of history and philosophy of religion at King's College London in 1985 and Regius Professor of Divinity at the University of Oxford in 1991, a post from which he retired in 2004.

In 1992, Ward was a visiting professor at the Claremont Graduate University in California. In 1993–94, he delivered the prestigious Gifford Lectures at the University of Glasgow. He was the Gresham Professor of Divinity between 2004 and 2008 at Gresham College, London.

Ward is on the council of the Royal Institute of Philosophy and is a member of the editorial boards of Religious Studies, the Journal of Contemporary Religion, Studies in Inter-Religious Dialogue and World Faiths Encounter. He is a member of the board of governors of the Oxford Centre for Hindu Studies. He has also been a visiting professor at Drake University, Iowa, and at the University of Tulsa, Oklahoma.

Ward has MA and DD degrees from both Cambridge and Oxford universities, and an honorary DD from the University of Glasgow.

Focus and beliefs

One of Ward's main focuses is the dialogue between religious traditions, an interest which led him to be joint president of the World Congress of Faiths (WCF) from 1992 to 2001. His work also explores concepts of God and the idea of revelation.  He has also written on his opinion of a relationship between science and religion. As an advocate of theistic evolution, he regards evolution and Christianity as essentially compatible, a belief he has described in his book God, Chance and Necessity and which is in contrast to his Oxford colleague Richard Dawkins, a vocal and prominent atheist.

Ward has said that Dawkins' conclusion that there is no God or any purpose in the universe is "naive" and not based on science but on a hatred of religion. Dawkins' strong anti-religious views originate, according to Ward, from earlier encounters with "certain forms of religion which are anti-intellectual and anti-scientific ... and also emotionally pressuring."

Ward has described his own Christian faith as follows:

I am a born-again Christian. I can give a precise day when Christ came to me and began to transform my life with his power and love. He did not make me a saint. But he did make me a forgiven sinner, liberated and renewed, touched by divine power and given the immense gift of an intimate sense of the personal presence of God. I have no difficulty in saying that I wholeheartedly accept Jesus as my personal Lord and Saviour.

Ward has criticised modern-day Christian fundamentalism, most notably in his 2004 book What the Bible Really Teaches: A Challenge for Fundamentalists. He believes that fundamentalists interpret the Bible in implausible ways and pick and choose which of its passages to emphasise to fit pre-existing beliefs. He argues that the Bible must be taken "seriously" but not always "literally" and does not agree with the doctrine of biblical inerrancy, saying that it is not found in the Bible, elaborating that

There may be discrepancies and errors in the sacred writings, but those truths that God wished to see included in the Scripture, and which are important to our salvation, are placed there without error ... the Bible is not inerrant in detail, but God has ensured that no substantial errors, which mislead us about the nature of salvation, are to be found in Scripture.

Works

Books
Ward is the author of many books on the nature of religion, the philosophy of religion, the Christian faith, religion and science, the Bible and its interpretation, comparative and systematic theology, and ethics and religion.

Books on the nature of religion include:
The Case for Religion (2004). Oneworld.
Is Religion Dangerous? (2006) ; rev. ed. with additional chapter on evolutionary psychology (2010)
Religion and Human Fulfilment (2008).
Is Religion Irrational? (2011)
Religion in the Modern World (2019). Cambridge University Press.

Books on the philosophy of religion include:
The Concept of God (1974) 
Holding Fast to God (1982)  – a critique of Taking Leave of God by the radical theologian Don Cupitt
Rational Theology and the Creativity of God (1984) 
Images of Eternity (1987) ; reissued as Concepts of God (1998) 
God, A Guide for the Perplexed (2002) 
The Battle for the Soul (1985) . Reissued by BBC Books in 1986. Reissued as Defending the Soul (1992) and In Defence of the Soul (1998) 
Why There Almost Certainly Is a God (2008)  (UK)  (US)
The God Conclusion (2009), published in the US as God and the Philosophers
More Than Matter: What Humans Really Are (2010) 
The Evidence for God: A Case for the Existence of the Spiritual Dimension (2014) 
The Christian Idea of God: A Philosophical Foundation for Faith (2017) 
Sharing in the Divine Nature (2020). Wipf and Stock.

Books on the Christian faith include:
The Christian Way (1976) 
A Vision to Pursue (1991) 
God, Faith and the New Millennium (1998)
Christianity: A Short Introduction (2000) , republished as Christianity: A Beginner's Guide
Christianity: A Guide for the Perplexed (2007)
Re-thinking Christianity (2007) 
Christ and the Cosmos: A Reformulation of Trinitarian Doctrine (2015) 

Books on religion and science include:
God, Chance and Necessity (1996) 
Pascal's Fire – Scientific Faith and Religious Understanding (2006) 
Divine Action: Examining God's Role in an Open and Emergent Universe (2008)
The Big Questions in Science and Religion (2008)

Books on the Bible and its interpretation include:
Is Christianity a Historical Religion? (1992) 

The Word of God? The Bible After Modern Scholarship (2010)
The Philosopher and the Gospels (2011) 
Love Is His Meaning: Understanding The Teaching Of Jesus (2017) 
Parables About Time and Eternity (2021)

Books on comparative and systematic theology include:
Religion and Revelation (1994)  (1993–94 Gifford Lectures
Religion and Creation (1996) 
Religion and Human Nature (1998) 
Religion and Community (2000) 
Religion and Human Fulfillment (2008) 

Books on ethics and religion include:
Ethics and Christianity (1970) 
Kant's View of Ethics (1972)
The Divine Image (1976) 
The Rule of Love (1989) 
God, Autonomy, and Morality (2013)

Other books include:
Fifty Key Words in Philosophy (1968). Lutterworth Press.
The Promise (1980; rev. ed. 2010). SPCK.
The Living God (1984) 
The Turn of the Tide (1986)
What Do We Mean By God?: A Little Book of Guidance (2015) 
The Mystery of Christ: Meditations and Prayers (2018) 
Confessions of a Recovering Fundamentalist (2020)

Multimedia
  Six other audio lectures with transcripts, recorded 2009–2015, are also available.
 Philosophy, Science and The God Debate, a two-DVD set of filmed interviews with Keith Ward, Alister McGrath and John Lennox, and produced by the Nationwide Christian Trust,  Product Code 5055307601776 (November 2011)

See also
 Boyle Lectures

References

Further reading
Comparative Theology: Essays for Keith Ward ed T. W. Bartel (2003) 
By Faith and Reason: The Essential Keith Ward eds Wm. Curtis Holtzen and Roberto Sirvent (2012)

External links

Keith Ward, Metanexus Senior Fellow

1938 births
20th-century Anglican theologians
20th-century British philosophers
20th-century English Anglican priests
20th-century English theologians
21st-century Anglican theologians
21st-century British philosophers
21st-century English Anglican priests
21st-century English theologians
Academics of Heythrop College
Academics of King's College London
Academics of the University of Glasgow
Academics of the University of Roehampton
Academics of the University of St Andrews
Alumni of Linacre College, Oxford
Alumni of the University of Wales
Analytic philosophers   
Analytic theologians
Anglican philosophers
Converts to Anglicanism from atheism or agnosticism
Deans of Trinity Hall, Cambridge
English Anglican theologians
English male non-fiction writers
Fellows of Christ Church, Oxford
Fellows of the British Academy
Fellows of Trinity Hall, Cambridge
Living people
People from Hexham
Philosophers of religion
Philosophy academics
Professors of Gresham College
Regius Professors of Divinity (University of Oxford)
Theistic evolutionists
Writers about religion and science
Writers from Northumberland